2014 Urawa Red Diamonds season.

J1 League

References

External links
 J.League official site

Urawa Red Diamonds
Urawa Red Diamonds seasons